A period room is a display that represents the interior design and decorative art of a particular historical social setting usually in a museum. Though it may incorporate elements of an individual real room that once existed somewhere, it is usually by its nature a composite and fictional piece. Period rooms at encyclopedic museums may represent different countries and cultures, while those at historic houses may represent different eras of the same structure. As with the glamorization of luxury in costume drama, this can be considered as a conservative genre that traditionally privileges Eurocentric elite views.

In the 21st century, the focus has shifted toward using period rooms in new ways or in diversifying them.

References

External links

Decorative arts
Heritage interpretation
Interior design
Museology
Period pieces
Relocated buildings and structures
Rooms